The six-spotted tiger beetle, also known as the six-spotted green tiger beetle (Cicindela sexguttata), is a common North American species of Tiger beetles in the Cicindelinae subfamily. It is common in many areas of the states, and is well known. It is recognized for its bright green color and its flight pattern. They're usually harmless and live up to 3 years.

Description
They are commonly found in deciduous forests in between Minnesota, Rhode Island, Ontario and south to Kentucky, and are easily recognizable by their large, white, overlapping mandibles. The adult is 12–14 mm (1/2-5/8") in length, and has fairly long legs. The mandibles give these attractive insects a ferocious appearance. While tiger beetles are voracious predators of small arthropods, they do not bite humans unless handled. Both the common name and the species name refer to the six small white spots on the beetle's metallic-green to metallic-blue-green elytra. This is not always the case, however, as some individuals may have more spots, fewer spots, or none at all, presumably due to genetic variation. This species is associated with wooded areas and they are often found in sunlit patches clear of undergrowth such as dirt paths and fallen logs where they hunt caterpillars, ants, spiders, and many other kinds of arthropods. Although tiger beetles are not gregarious, many beetles may sometimes be seen in one suitable hunting area. The female lays her eggs in sandy patches, and the larvae burrow into the ground after they hatch. Here they lie in wait until small arthropods pass by, at which time the larvae lunge out of their burrows at their prey. The beetles develop as larvae for about one year before pupating, and the insect has a total lifespan of just under 5 years.

Gallery

References

External links

Cicindela sexguttata, BugGuide
Cicindela sexguttata, Tiger Beetle of Connecticut
Cicindela sexguttata, Tiger Beetles of Ontario
Tiger Beetles, Canadian Biodiversity Web Site

sexguttata
Beetles of North America
Beetles described in 1775
Taxa named by Johan Christian Fabricius